Lee Guem-yi (born January 4, 1962) is an author of children's and young adult literature who is recognized to have pioneered and further expanded the genre of children's and young adult fiction in Korea. Since her debut in 1984, she has authored more than fifty literary works. In the early days of her career, she mainly wrote children's stories set in rural areas including Keundori in Bamtee Village, leading her to earn the nickname “the writer of agricultural villages.” Lee has aimed to address the dark underbelly of the developing Korean society and issues involving minorities including women and the handicapped. Since the release of her first young adult novel Yujin and Yujin in 2004, Lee has been making deep observations into the lives of teenagers and incorporating the varied social and psychological issues they face into her work. Moreover, through historical novels Can’t I Go Instead?  and The Picture Bride, she has provided in-depth insight into modern and contemporary Korean history and expanded the limits and beyond of young adult fiction. In 2018, she was selected for the IBBY Honour List for Can’t I Go Instead?  She was nominated for the Hans Christian Andersen Award, regarded as the Nobel Prize for children's literature, in both 2020 and 2024.

Career 
Lee Geum-yi made her official debut as an author in 1984 with Younggu and Heukgu, which received the Saebeot Literary Award. In 1985, she received the JoongAng Children's Literature Award for Uncle Bongsam and the Kyemongsa Children's Literature Award for The Tree That Grows in My Heart in 1987. She was honored with the Socheon Children's Book Award for Withdrawal Symptoms in 2007, the Yun Seokjung Literary Award for Feed in 2012, and the Bang Jeonghwan Literary Award for One Night in 2017. In 2018, she was selected for the IBBY Honour List for Can’t I Go Instead?. In 2020, she was selected as the Korean nominee for the Hans Christian Andersen Award.The Picture Bride , which was published in 2020, is her first novel to be published in English. The Picture Bride and Yujin and Yujin (published in 2004) have been adapted into musicals.The Picture Bride and Yujin and Yujin (published in 2004) have been adapted into musicals.

Awards 

 2024, 2020 Korean nominee for the Hans Christian Andersen Award
 2020 YES24 Book of the Year - The Picture Bride
 2019 Open Children's Book Literature Award - They Called My Name
 2019 Nadaum Book by the Ministry of Gender Equality and Family - Like the Rowdy Princess
 2018 IBBY Honour List - Can’t I Go Instead? 
 2017 Bang Jeong-hwan Literary Award - One Night
 2012 Yun Seokjung Literary Award - Pet Food for You
 2007 Socheon Children's Book Award: Foster Care
 2006 10 children's book writers loved by Korean by Interpark Bookstore
 1999 10 Korean children's books that represent the 20th century by Korean Children's Book Association - Keundori in Bamtee Village
 1996 20 Best Children's books by Korean Association of Children's Literature - My Teeth on the Roof
 1987 Kyemongsa Children's Literature Award: Be the Bridge
 1985 JoongAng Children's Literature Award: Uncle Bongsam
 1984 Saebeot Literary Award: Younggu and Heukgu

Adaptations 

 2022 Musical <Aloha, My Moms〉 (Based upon The Picture Bride) 
 2021 Webtoon 〈Can't I Go Instead?〉 (Based upon the same title)
 2021 Musical 〈Yujin and Yujin〉 (Based upon the same title)
 2021 Theater Play 〈Yujin and Yujin〉 (Based upon the same title)
 2013 Short Animation for Improving Awareness of the Disabled (Based upon Just Different from Me)
 2002 EBS Children Literature in TV Drama: Just Different from Me
 2001 KBS TV Drama - Keundori in Bamtee Village

Works

YA Novels 

 2020The Picture Bride (Changbi Publishers) ISBN 978-89-364-6576-6
 2022  (Forge Books/Macmillan, USA) (trans. An Seonjae) ISBN 978-12-508-0866-0
 2022  (Scribe Publications, Australia) (trans. An Seonjae) ISBN 978-19-223-1085-9
 2019 Life traveler (Munhakdongne Publishing)
 2016 Can’t I Go Instead?  (Sakyejul Publishing) 
 2023 (Forge Books/Macmillan, USA) (trans. An Seonjae)
 2022 (そこに私が行ってもいいですか?, 里山社, Japan) (trans. 神谷丹路)
 2014 Youth Stories (Sakyejul Publishing)
 2014 Searching For the Hidden Path (Prooni Publishing) 
 2021 (rev.) (Bamtee Publishing)
 2013 The Moment Ice Sparkles (Prooni Publishing) 
 2121 Us, In the Land of the Giants (Prooni Publishing) 
 2022 (Bamtee Publishing) ISBN 979-11-91826-05-0
 2013 So-hee’s Room (Prooni Publishing)
 2021 (Bamtee Publishing) ISBN 979-11-91826-02-9
 2010 A Marionette’s Dance (Prooni Publishing)
 2022 (Bamtee Publishing) ISBN 979-11-91826-19-7
 2009 Goodbye, My First Love (Prooni Publishing)
 2021 (Bamtee Publishing) ISBN 979-11-91826-04-3
 2008 Cliff (Prooni Publishing) ISBN 979-11-91826-22-7
 2008 The Whale in My Pocket (Prooni Publishing)
 2021 (Bamtee Publishing) ISBN 979-11-971205-5-8
 2004 Yujin and Yujin (Prooni Publishing)
 2020 (Bamtee Publishing) ISBN 979-11-97120-54-1
 2023 (有真与有真 Beijing Yuchen Culture, China)
 2011 (Yujin et Yujin Picquier, France) 
 1999 You Too Are a Twilight Lily (Prooni Publishing)
 2021 (Bamtee Publishing, 2021) ISBN 978-89-5798-102-3

Children's Fiction 

 2012 Pet Food for You (Prooni Publishing) 
 2006 Foster Care (Prooni Publishing)
 2021 (Bamtee Publishing)
 2004 A Very Tiny School (Prooni Publishing) ISBN 9788957980071
 2003 Mito’s Poop Is Cute Too (Prooni Publishing) 
 2002 Handy Boy (Prooni Publishing) 
 2002 Jaedeok My Friend (Prooni Publishing) ISBN 9788957980873
 2000 Mother Earth (Prooni Publishing) ISBN 9788988578346
 2000 Just Different from Me (Prooni Publishing) ISBN 9788957980705
 2000 The Country of My Mother (Prooni Publishing) ISBN  9788957980583
 1999 A Rat Called Hamster (Prooni Publishing) ISBN  9788957980637
 1999 Kkebi from Dodeulmaru (Sigongsa Publishing) ISBN  9788957980637
 1996 My Teeth on the Roof (Doosan Donga Publishing) ISBN 9788900051285
 2001 (Prooni Publishing) ISBN 9788957980538
 1996 Sand Pebble School (Daekyo Publishing) ISBN 9788939507401
 2002 (Prooni Publishing) ISBN 9788988578797
 1996 Barefooted Children (Hyeonamsa Publishing)
 2007(Prooni Publishing) ISBN  9788957981290
 1994 Bamtee Village Series
 1994 Keundori in Bamtee Village (Daekyo Publishing)| 2004 (Prooni Publishing) 
 2000 Yeongmi in Bamtee Village (Prooni Publishing) 
 2005 Bomi in Bamtee Village (Prooni Publishing) 
 1994 Children at Solmoru Ranch (Donga Publishing) ISBN 9788900033755
 1991 Younggu and Heukgu (Hyeonamsa Publishing)
 2002 (Prooni Publishing) ISBN 
 1988 The Flower-Scented Wind (Daekyo Publishing)
 1999, 2007 (Prooni Publishing) 
 1987 Be the Bridge (Kyemongsa Publishing) ISBN 9788957982846
 2005 (Prooni Publishing)

Early Reader Books 

 2021 Looking for Cha Daegi (Sakyejul Publishing) ISBN 9791160947304
 2019 They Called My Name (Suntree Books) ISBN 9788962681840
 2019 Like the Rowdy Princess (Sakyejul Publishing) ISBN 9791160944570
 2022 A Princesa indomável (Atalante Editores Ltda./Casa Oito, Brazil)
 2016 One Night (Sakyejul Publishing) ISBN 9788958284468
 2011 The Granny Riding a Tiger (Prooni Publishing) ISBN 9788961702072
 2010 Hate It, Don’t Know It, Just Because (Prooni Publishing) 
 2022 (Bamtee Publishing) ISBN 9791191826081
 2009 Not the Way I Want (Prooni Publishing) 
 2022 (Bamtee Publishing)
 2008 Secret Helper at Our House (Prooni Publishing) ISBN 9788961700641
 2008 My Teacher Hates Me (Prooni Publishing) ISBN 9788961700405
 2022 (Bamtee Publishing)  ISBN 9791191826067
 2007 Popsicles and Water Skiing (Prooni Publishing) ISBN 9788957980972
 2005 Twelve Animals in the Tripitaka Koreana (Prooni Publishing) ISBN 9788990794147
 2002 I’m Right, It’s a Whale! (Prooni Publishing) ISBN 9788988578544
 2002, 2007 Pruni and Gouni (Prooni Publishing) ISBN 9788990794697
 2001 Kimchi Is Kimchi Even in English (Prooni Publishing) ISBN 9788957980392
 1991 Betting Your Calf (Junghan Publishing)
 2008 (Prooni Publishing) ISBN 9788961700306

Other Titles 

 2012 Fermata Italy (Sakyejul Publishing) ISBN 9791160947564
 2006, 2011 Lee Geum-yi’s Children’s Book Creative Class (Prooni Publishing)

References

External links 

 Official Website
 Personal Blog
 "Author Talks: Lee Geum-Yi”, Korea Sociery” , October 04, 2022
 "Panel Discussion and Talk,” Asian Festival of Children’s Content, May 26-29, 2022
 "Letter by Lee Geum-yi, Author of The Picture Bride,”  August 11, 2022
 "Asian Revier of Books,The Picture Bride” by Lee Geum-yi”  October 2, 2022

Living people
1962 births
Korean writers
Young adult literature